Talbot Rice Gallery is the public art gallery of the University of Edinburgh, in Scotland. With a 19th-century former natural history museum and a contemporary white cube gallery.

History

The University of Edinburgh's historic Old College was designed by Robert Adam and completed by William Henry Playfair. In 1967 the library collection was moved to a new location. An arts centre with an exhibition hall was opened in the Quad in 1970, following a £20,000 renovation paid for by the Gulbenkian Foundation. The gallery was opened in 1975 under the guidance of Prof Giles Henry Robertson and takes its name from his predecessor, Prof David Talbot Rice, the Watson Gordon Professor of Fine Art at the University of Edinburgh from 1934 to 1972.

The Gallery fundraises for their artistic programme, and has to date received support from Creative Scotland, as well as international and grant support including Mondriaan Fonds, Culture Ireland and the Freelands Foundation. In 2019, the Gallery was awarded an Arts and Humanities Research Council grant for the first time. The Talbot Rice Gallery is open to the public and admission free.

References

Buildings and structures of the University of Edinburgh
Art museums and galleries in Edinburgh
University museums in Scotland
1975 establishments in Scotland
Art museums established in 1975
Scottish contemporary art